The 2010 Sicilia Classic was a professional tennis tournament played on outdoor red clay courts. It was the second edition of the tournament which was part of the 2010 ATP Challenger Tour. It took place in Palermo, Italy between 4 and 10 October 2010.

ATP entrants

Seeds

 Rankings are as of 27 September 2010.

Other entrants
The following players received wildcards into the singles main draw:
  Francesco Aldi
  Simone Bolelli
  Marco Cecchinato
  Thomas Muster

The following players received a special entrant into the singles main draw:
  Boris Pašanski

The following players received entry from the qualifying draw:
  Nicolas Devilder
  Alessandro Giannessi
  Gianluca Naso
  Walter Trusendi

Champions

Singles

 Attila Balázs def.  Martin Fischer, 7–6(4), 2–6, 6–1

Doubles

 Martin Fischer /  Philipp Oswald def.  Alessandro Motti /  Simone Vagnozzi, 4–6, 6–2, [10–6]

References

Official website
ITF search 
2010 Draws

Sicilia Classic
Clay court tennis tournaments
Sicilia Classic